Love at Sea  is a 1964 French film written and directed by Guy Gilles.

Synopsis 
A sailor (Daniel Moosmann) has a brief affair with a young secretary (Geneviève Thénier).

Technical information 

 Title : L’Amour à la mer
 Director: Guy Gilles
 Script: Guy Gilles
 Dialogues: Guy Gilles
 Director of Photography: Jean-Marc Ripert
 Music: Jean-Pierre Sarrot
 Additional music: Antonio Vivaldi
 Sound: Jean-Jacques Mushroom
 Editor: Jacqueline Fano
 Country of origin: France
 Filmed: 1962
 Filming locations:
 Paris
 Brest (Brittany)
 Producer: Guy Gilles
 Production Manager: Olivier Reichenbach
 Production Company: Films Galilee (France)
 Format: black and white and color by Eastmancolor - monophonic sound - 35 mm
 Genre: comedy drama
 Duration: 73 minutes
 Release date: 1965 in France

Cast 

 Daniel Moosmann : Daniel
 Guy Gilles : Guy
 Geneviève Thénier : Geneviève
 Simone Paris : landlady
 Josette Krief : Josette 
 Lili Bontemps : singer
 Juliette Gréco : film actress
 Alain Delon : film actor
 Romy Schneider : the star (scene cut)
 Jean-Claude Brialy : man
 Sophie Daumier : girl at the bar
 Jean-Pierre Léaud :  boy leaving the cinema
 Bernard Verley : a friend of Geneviève
 Jean-Daniel Simon

External links 
 

1964 films
French drama films
1960s French-language films
1964 drama films
Films directed by Guy Gilles
1960s French films